William Summers Anderson (March 29, 1919 – June 29, 2021) was a British businessman who served as President and Chairman of the National Cash Register Corp (NCR) from 1972 to 1984.

Early life and education
Anderson was born in March 1919 in Hankow in Central China and went to school in Wuhan and Shanghai. Anderson’s parents were part of a large expatriate community in Wuhan. As his father was Scottish, he was born a British citizen. Just as he was about to graduate from the PTH high school in Shanghai, the Sino-Japanese war broke out. In 1937, Anderson and his recently widowed mother fled to Hong Kong where they made their new home and he took a job as an internal auditor at The Peninsula Hotel Group while studying accountancy in the evenings. Two years later, after gaining his qualifications, he joined an auditing firm.

Anderson was fluent in Cantonese and Mandarin Chinese.

Military service and prisoner of war
On December 8, 1941, the day after the Japanese attacked Pearl Harbor, Hong Kong was also attacked by the Japanese. As a member of the Hong Kong Volunteer Defence Corps, Anderson fought the Japanese but after 17 days of heavy fighting Hong Kong surrendered. On Christmas Day 1941, exactly four years after he had escaped from the Japanese in China, he became a prisoner of war (POW) and lost his second home. For the first two years, he was in a prison camp in Hong Kong before being moved to Nagoya, Japan as part of a group of 400, to work in a railway locomotive factory. Here the work was very hard; inmates worked 13 days out of 14 and were beaten on occasion. Towards the end of 1944, Japan was being bombed regularly. In May 1945, a large air raid over Nagoya knocked out the factory and the POWs were sent across the country to Toyama on the west coast to work at a branch of the locomotive factory. Toyama was almost totally destroyed in a fire bomb raid on August 1, 1945, after which the POWs were confined to barracks until the Japanese surrender on August 15, 1945. He was evacuated from Japan to the Philippines and as a British citizen, sent to England after two weeks of recovery in Canada.

NCR beginnings
One of Anderson’s fellow POWs was George Haynes who was the manager of NCR China. After the war, Haynes persuaded Anderson to join NCR and after some brief sales training in England, he was appointed general manager of NCR Hong Kong. At that time NCR Hong Kong was a war-shattered, rag tag branch of about seven people scratching out a living in used business machines. Using his accounting contacts he succeeded in selling accounting machines to all the banks and utility companies, and many commercial and industrial companies.  Anderson had studied both Mandarin and Cantonese in his school days and this assisted him greatly during his time in Hong Kong. By 1960, NCR had acquired 97% of the Hong Kong business machine market. At that time George Haynes was based in Japan, heading up the Far East operation.

NCR Japan
When George Haynes was promoted to  head office in Dayton Ohio, Anderson left Hong Kong to become Chairman of the Japanese company and vice president for the Far East region. Anderson introduced a “vocational” approach to the Japanese sales organisation whereby a particular customer would have a single point of contact with NCR regardless of the type of product being sold. Under his guidance NCR Japan became the most profitable of all of NCR's worldwide operations.

President of NCR
In 1971, NCR was in serious trouble and was in danger of going out of business. The company had been slow to move from mechanical to electronic products. The board of directors with unusual vision of those times decided that there was no one among the 30 officers of the parent company that could do the job of saving the company and Anderson was asked. So in June 1972, Anderson became CEO of NCR and started the transformation of NCR to be a full electronic data processing company. Many difficult days and the problems ensued. Not only did he have to change the hardware aspects of a mechanical machine business to one making things that worked with bits and bytes, but he had to change the mentality of everyone in the company to do things differently. Anderson also had problems with an unsympathetic media and the UAW.  NCR was the first company to force the UAW to agree to a two-tier wage system (GM management negotiated a similar contract some 30 years later). He was appointed chairman of NCR in 1974. Anderson briefly considered moving NCR headquarters away from Dayton, but came to the conclusion that it would be too costly and that an international organisation could be run from anywhere in the world. NCR staged a spectacular recovery and when Anderson retired on the 100th anniversary of the company in 1984, NCR was in very good shape.

Later life
Anderson stayed on the NCR board of directors until 1989 and was not involved in the acquisition of the company by AT&T in 1991 (NCR was subsequently renamed “AT&T GIS”). The merger was a failure and NCR once again became a stand-alone company in 1997. In his 1991 autobiography, Anderson was optimistic about the AT&T merger, but in a speech in 2006, he described the exercise as a disaster: not only did the market capitalization drop from $7.4 billion to $3.4 billion, there were also operating losses of $4 billion, a total cost to AT&T shareholders of $8 billion. Anderson attributed the failure of the merger to an arrogant attitude by AT&T which resulted in the loss of 90% of NCR’s senior officers and mid-managers which led to the loss of long-time customers.

After retirement from NCR, Anderson served on various stock exchange boards of directors as well as boards of non-profit organizations. He died in June 2021 at the age of 102.

Sources
2006 biography of William S. Anderson
2006 speech to Dayton Rotary Club

References

1919 births
2021 deaths
British centenarians
British expatriates in China
British expatriates in the United States
British Malaya military personnel of World War II
British technology chief executives
British World War II prisoners of war
Businesspeople from Wuhan
Men centenarians
NCR Corporation people
World War II prisoners of war held by Germany